Haçka SK, formerly Trabzon Akçaabat FK, is a sports club located in Akçaabat near Trabzon, Turkey. The football club plays in white and blue kits, and have done so since their formation in 1980.

Stadium
Currently the team plays at the 6,300 capacity Akçaabat Fatih Stadium.

League participations
TFF Third League: 1987–1997, 2009–2015
Turkish Regional Amateur League: 2015–2016
Super Amateur Leagues: 1980–1987, 1997–2009, 2016–present

Former name
1980–2012 Yalıspor
2012–2013 Trabzon Kanuni FK
2013–2015 Trabzon Akçaabat FK
2015–2016 Trabzon Kanuni FK
2016– Haçka SK

References

External links
Haçka SK on TFF.org

Sport in Trabzon
Football clubs in Turkey
Association football clubs established in 1980